Futbol Club Barcelona is a professional association football club based in Barcelona, Catalonia, Spain. The club was founded in 1899 by a group of Swiss, English and Spanish men led by Joan Gamper, and played its first friendly match on 8 December 1899. Initially, Barcelona played against other local clubs in various Catalan tournaments, but in 1929 the club became one of the founding members of La Liga, Spain's first national league. As of 2022, Barcelona is one of only three clubs to have never been relegated from the top level of Spanish football, the others being Athletic Bilbao and Real Madrid.

In the period from 1919 to 1929, Barça won the Copa del Rey five times and the Campionat de Catalunya nine times. Barcelona enjoyed a successful start in La Liga, winning the championship in the competition's first season. However, they did not win the league again until 1945. Three seasons prior to that, Barcelona finished twelfth, which remains, as of 2022, the club's lowest league finish. Barcelona won five trophies in the 1951–52 season, becoming known as "Barça of the Five Cups" (Catalan: el Barça de les Cinc Copes), and went on to win La Liga three times, the Copa del Rey five times and the Inter-Cities Fairs Cup once during the 1950s. The club then entered a lean spell, with only two league titles between 1960 and 1990. In 1988, former legendary player Johan Cruyff was appointed manager and assembled what would later be known as the "Dream Team". In 1991, he led the club to its first league title in six years and repeated the feat the following season when Barça also won the European Cup for the first time. In the 1993–94 season, Barcelona won their fourth consecutive league title, edging out Deportivo de La Coruña on goal difference after the two clubs finished level on points.

Newly elected president Joan Laporta's  appointment of Frank Rijkaard as coach and the signing of Ronaldinho in 2003 marked the beginning of another spell of sustained success. In 2005, Barcelona once again won La Liga championship, and retained it the following season. In May 2006, Barcelona defeated Arsenal in the Champions League final, coming back from 0–1 to win 2–1 in the last fifteen minutes. Three years later, the club beat Manchester United 2–0 in the 2009 Champions League final, having already won La Liga and the Copa del Rey that season, to become the first Spanish side to complete the treble. In December 2009, Barcelona won the Club World Cup, having also won the Spanish and European Super Cups, thereby completing an unprecedented sextuple.

The club has won La Liga championship twenty six times, the Copa del Rey thirty one times, the Copa de la Liga twice, the Supercopa de España thirteen times, the Copa Eva Duarte three times, the Champions League five times, the Cup Winners' Cup four times, the Fairs Cup three times, the Super Cup five times and the Club World Cup three times. The table details the club's achievements in the early regional championships and in all national and international first-team competitions for each completed season since the club's formation in 1899.

Key 

Key to league:
 Pos. = Final position
 Pld = Matches played
 W = Matches won
 D = Matches drawn
 W= Matches won
 GF = Goals for
 GA = Goals against
 Pts = Points

Key to rounds:
 C = Champions
 F = Final (Runners-up)
 SF = Semi-finals
 QF = Quarter-finals
 R16/R32 = Round of 16, round of 32, etc.
 GS = Group stage

Top scorers shown in italics with number of goals scored in bold  are players who were also top scorers in La Liga that season.

Seasons

Pre-La Liga era 
During this period Spain did not have a national football league. Barcelona competed in the championship of the Catalonia region, the winners of which qualified for the Copa del Rey along with the other regional champions. Barcelona also won the Pyrenees Cup, the first competition played between European clubs, four times (1910, 1911, 1912, 1913).

La Liga era
In 1929, La Liga, Spain's first national football league, was formed, with Barcelona among the founding members. The club also competed in the Catalan championship until it was abandoned in 1940. The Copa del Rey continued alongside La Liga. Clubs continued to qualify for it based on their placings in the regional championships until 1940, when it became open to all teams in the top two divisions of the Spanish League and selected other teams.
(* Barcelona also won the Mediterranean League in 1937.)

Notes

References

General

Specific

External links 

Seasons
 
Barcelona
Seasons